John Paterson Rankin (10 May 1901 – 24 September 1952) was a Scottish footballer who played as an inside forward for clubs including Hamilton Academical, Dundee, Charlton Athletic, Chelsea and Notts County. He played on the losing side in the 1925 Scottish Cup Final while with Dundee and won the Football League Third Division South title in 1928–29 with Charlton, prior to playing in the English top flight with Chelsea where he featured regularly during the 1931–32 and 1932–33 campaigns.

References

Scottish footballers
Association football inside forwards
1901 births
1952 deaths
Footballers from Coatbridge
Scottish Football League players
Scottish Junior Football Association players
English Football League players
Bradford City A.F.C. players
Bellshill Athletic F.C. players
Hamilton Academical F.C. players
Ayr United F.C. players
Mid-Annandale F.C. players
Dundee F.C. players
Doncaster Rovers F.C. players
Charlton Athletic F.C. players
Chelsea F.C. players
Notts County F.C. players
Burton Town F.C. players